Jamaica national basketball team is governed by the Jamaica Basketball Association.

The team had its best performance at the 2013 FIBA Americas Championship where it beat the two former world champions Brazil and Argentina.

Outlook
The team finished in seventh place in the 2006 Centrobasket with a 1-4 record. The lone victory was a 100-57 win over Costa Rica. In the 2010 Centrobasket, led by Roy Hibbert, they finished in fifth place with a record of 2–2. The 2012 Centrobasket saw them win their first medal (bronze).

Roster
2020 Team Coming Soon

Depth chart

Notable players

Other current notable players from Jamaica:

Results

Summer Olympics
yet to qualify

FIBA World Cup
yet to qualify

FIBA AmeriCup

Other tournaments
Season: 2010 (CAC Games)

Season: 2010 (Centrobasket)

Past rosters
Team for the 2014 Centrobasket.

Team for the 2013 FIBA Americas Championship.

Head coach position
 Rick Turner – 2018-now

Kit

Sponsor
2013: KFC

2021: Davis Law Group

See also
 Jamaica women's national basketball team
 Jamaica men's national under-19 basketball team
 Jamaica men's national under-17 basketball team
 Jamaica men's national 3x3 team

References

External links
Official website
Presentation at CaribbeanBasketball.com
FIBA Profile
Latinbasket.com - Jamaica Men National Team 
Archived records of Jamaica team participations

Men's national basketball teams
1962 establishments in Jamaica
Basketball in Jamaica
Basketball teams in Jamaica
Basketball